Heavy Meadow is a solo album by Anni Rossi, initially released in 2010 on iTunes after a split with the 4AD record label.
In 2011, the album was released in the UK via 3 Syllables records.

Track listing
All songs were written by Anni Rossi.
 Candyland
 Crushing Limbs
 Hatchet
 Sandstorm
 Switchblade
 Texan Plains
 Land Majestic
 Frame Me Right
 The Fight
 Cha Cha Cha
 Safety Of Objects

External links
http://www.annirossi.com Official website

References

2010 albums
Anni Rossi albums
Albums produced by Steve Albini